J.-Émile Ferron (25 September 1896 – 2 March 1970) was a lawyer and federal Quebec politician.

He was born in Saint-Léon in the region of Maskinongé, Quebec where he practiced law until being elected from the riding of Berthier-Maskinongé to the House of Commons of Canada as a Liberal in the 1935 federal election. He was re-elected in 1940 but defeated in 1945.

External links
 

1896 births
1970 deaths
Members of the House of Commons of Canada from Quebec
Liberal Party of Canada MPs
Lawyers in Quebec